Peter Jones (born 24 July 1972) is an Australian former professional rugby league footballer who played in the 1990s and 2000s.

Background

Playing career
In Round 5 of the 1995 ARL season, Jones made his first grade debut for the Cowboys in their 12–20 loss to the Brisbane Broncos. In his rookie season, he played 12 games, scoring two tries. In 1996, he became a regular for the club, playing 19 games that year. In 1997, he played 16 games before missing the entire 1998 season due to injury.

In 1999, Jones returned to first grade, playing 22 games for the Cowboys, starting in all but one. In 2000, he played in 20 games. In Round 13 of the 2001 NRL season, Jones played his 100th game for the club, the first player to do so, in a 35–18 win over the New Zealand Warriors. Earlier that season, Jones was one of three players who testified against Wests Tigers player John Hopoate, who was found guilty of unsportsmanlike interference, in that Hopoate had inserted his finger into their anuses during the match. 

At the end of 2002 season, Jones announced his retirement and at the time was the club's longest serving player.

Achievements and accolades

Individual
North Queensland Cowboys Clubman of the Year: 2001

Statistics

ARL/Super League/NRL

Post-playing career
Following his retirement, Jones worked for the Cowboys. First as a recruitment manager from 2003 to 2007 and then as football operations manager from 2007 to 2012.

References

External links
Statistics from Rugby League Project

1972 births
Living people
Australian rugby league players
North Queensland Cowboys players
Rugby league second-rows
Rugby league locks
Rugby league players from Queensland